My Father Confused Me... What Must I Do? What Must I Do? is the 16th comedy album by Bill Cosby, originally released on vinyl in 1977. It was re-released on CD as the first disc of The Bill Cosby Collection, the second disc being Cosby's follow up comedy record, 1978's Bill's Best Friend. Much of the material was recycled in the 1983 performance film Bill Cosby: Himself (and the accompanying soundtrack album).

Track listing
"The English Language" - 3:35
"Henry Kissinger" - 0:42
"UFO" - 1:38
"My Father Confused Me" - 2:11
"The Glazed Donut Monster" - 2:10
"Mothers Enunciate" - 1:33
"The FCC and Mothers" - 2:57
"Mothers Will Hit You for Nothing" - 1:23
"Fathers Are the Funniest People" - 2:26
"Marriage and Duties" - 1:45
"New Husbands Kill Things" - 3:00
"The Lizard and the Mouse" - 2:54
"Dudes on Dope" - 2:39
"The Dentist" - 8:59

Charts

References

1977 albums
Bill Cosby albums
Spoken word albums by American artists
Live spoken word albums
Capitol Records albums
1970s comedy albums